Aryeh Nussbaum Cohen (born c. 1994) is an American countertenor. He was a winner of the 2017 Metropolitan Opera National Council Auditions Grand Finals, after which he was described as "a complete artist" and "young star" in The New York Times. He has also been described as "extravagantly gifted... poised to redefine what's possible for singers of this distinctive voice type" in the San Francisco Chronicle.

Early life
Born and raised in Brooklyn, New York, Nussbaum Cohen grew up singing in the Brooklyn Youth Chorus and HaZamir, a Jewish international youth choir. He was an assistant cantor at East Midwood Jewish Center on Rosh Hashanah and Yom Kippur. He attended Fiorello H. LaGuardia High School, where he first began vocal studies, and he then attended Princeton University, where he majored in History (with a concentration in Intellectual and Cultural History) and minored in Vocal Performance and Judaic Studies.

Career

Opera
While still a student at Princeton University, Nussbaum Cohen made his European debut at age 20, singing the lead role of Timante in the modern-day revival of Christoph Willibald Gluck's opera, Demofoonte at the Theater an der Wien with Maestro Alan Curtis and Il Complesso Barocco.

He went on to complete his training as a member of the Merola Opera Program at San Francisco Opera in 2016, the Houston Grand Opera Studio for 2017-18 (where he was the first countertenor in the Studio‘s history), and the Adler Fellowship Program at San Francisco Opera for 2018-19.

His operatic roles have included:

Rosencrantz in Brett Dean's Hamlet - The Metropolitan Opera, New York
Prince Go-Go in Ligeti's Le Grand Macabre - Radio Filharmonisch Orkest, Netherlands (concert performance)
Giulio Cesare in Handel's Giulio Cesare in Egitto - Moscow Chamber Orchestra, Russia (concert performance)
Oberon in Benjamin Britten‘s A Midsummer Night's Dream (opera) - Adelaide Festival, Australia
 David in Handel‘s Saul (Handel) - Houston Grand Opera, Texas
 Medoro in Handel‘s Orlando (opera) - San Francisco Opera, California
 Ottone in Handel's Agrippina - Ars Lyrica Houston, Texas
 Nireno in Handel's Giulio Cesare in Egitto - Houston Grand Opera, Texas
 Nerone and Ottone in Monteverdi's L’incoronazione di Poppea - Cincinnati Opera - Ohio, Princeton University
 The Angel in Jonathan Dove's Tobias and the Angel
 Cefalo in Cavalli's Gli amori d'Apollo e di Dafne

Concert
Nussbaum Cohen‘s concert performances include the world premiere performances of Kenneth Fuchs‘ Poems of Life with the Virginia Symphony, led by Maestro JoAnn Falletta, which he then recorded with the London Symphony Orchestra. The album went on to win a 2019 GRAMMY Award.

He has performed works such as Bernstein‘s Chichester Psalms (with the Buffalo Philharmonic), Handel‘s Messiah (with the San Francisco Symphony, Saint Paul Chamber Orchestra, American Bach Soloists, and others), Handel‘s Saul (with Philharmonia Baroque Orchestra and Maestro Nic McGegan), Bach's Christmas Oratorio (with the Portland Baroque Orchestra), and many others.

Awards
In 2016-17, as well as being awarded the Grand Prize of the Metropolitan Opera National Council Auditions, Nussbaum Cohen was First Prize winner in the Houston Grand Opera Eleanor McCollum Competition, recipient of a Sara Tucker Study Grant from the Richard Tucker Music Foundation and winner of the Irvin Scherzer Award from the George London Foundation.
He was First Prize Winner and Audience Choice Award recipient at the 2018 Dallas Opera Guild Vocal Competition, and he was Third Prize Winner, and the only American to place, in the 2019 edition of Placido Domingo’s Operalia.
He was also winner of a 2019 William Matheus Sullivan Musical Foundation Award.

His first commercial recording - the world premiere recording of Kenneth Fuchs' Poems of Life with the London Symphony Orchestra, conducted by JoAnn Falletta - won a 2019 GRAMMY Award in the Best Classical Compendium category.

During his senior year at Princeton University, he became the first singer in a decade to win the Princeton University Concerto Competition. Upon graduating in 2015, he was awarded the Isidore and Helen Sacks Memorial Prize for extraordinary achievement in the art, granted each year to the student of greatest promise in the performance of classical music.

Recordings
Nussbaum Cohen's discography includes the following:

 David in Handel‘s Saul (Handel) with Maestro Nic McGegan and Philharmonia Baroque Orchestra
 A solo CD of works by Gluck, Handel, and Vivaldi with American Bach Soloists
 Kenneth Fuchs‘ Poems of Life with Maestro JoAnn Falletta and the London Symphony Orchestra

Personal life 
Nussbaum Cohen currently resides in Northern California with his wife Abbi. He serves as Western Region Soloist Representative on the board of the American Guild of Musical Artists, the union that represents America's operatic, dance, and choral artists.

References

External links
 

Princeton University alumni
Living people
1990s births
Jewish American musicians
21st-century American male  opera singers
Operatic countertenors
Fiorello H. LaGuardia High School alumni
Musicians from Brooklyn
Singers from New York City
Classical musicians from New York (state)
21st-century American Jews